Opercularia vaginata (dogweed) is a species of plant within the genus Opercularia, in the family Rubiaceae.  It is endemic to the southwest of Western Australia.

Description

O. vaginata is a spreading or erect perennial which grows to a height of 0.45 m  on sandy, granitic and lateritic soils, and coastal limestone. Its green or green-yellow flowers are seen from July to December.

Distribution
It is found in Beard's provinces of Eremaean Province and the South-West Province, or the later classification of IBRA regions of 
Avon Wheatbelt, Coolgardie (biogeographic region), Esperance Plains, Gascoyne, Geraldton Sandplains, Jarrah Forest, Mallee (biogeographic region), Murchison (biogeographic region), Swan Coastal Plain, Warren and Yalgoo (biogeographic region).

Taxonomy
It was first described by Jacques Labillardiere in 1804 as Opercularia vaginata in de Jussieu's Annales du Muséum d'histoire naturelle.

References

vaginata
Flora of Western Australia
Taxa named by Jacques Labillardière
Plants described in 1804